The men's long jump event at the 2005 Summer Universiade was held on 17–18 August in Izmir, Turkey.

Medalists

Results

Qualification

Final

References

Finals results
Full results

Athletics at the 2005 Summer Universiade
2005